Paul Haarhuis and Yevgeny Kafelnikov were defending champions, but they lost in the final to third seeds Bob and Mike Bryan, who won the first Grand Slam title of their careers.

Seeds

Draw

Finals

Top half

Section 1

Section 2

Bottom half

Section 3

Section 4

External links
Association of Tennis Professionals (ATP) – main draw
2003 French Open – Men's draws and results at the International Tennis Federation

Men's Doubles
French Open by year – Men's doubles
French OPen